, there were about 30,000 electric vehicles in Massachusetts.

In July 2021, Massachusetts was ranked by AutoInsuranceEZ as the second-best state in the United States to own an electric car, behind California.

Government policy
In December 2020, the state government announced a requirement that all new cars sold in the state be electric by 2035.

, the state offers a $2,500 tax rebate for electric vehicle purchases.

Charging stations
, there were around 1,600 charging stations in Massachusetts.

In February 2022, the state government announced a  program to build charging stations.

Public opinion
A poll conducted in 2021 by Coltura and the Green Energy Consumers Alliance showed that 56% of Massachusetts voters were likely to buy an electric vehicle in the next five years.

By region

Boston
, there were about 2,000 electric vehicles registered in Boston.

, there were 10 municipally-owned charging stations in Boston. In December 2021, Boston mayor Michelle Wu announced plans to add about 70 additional charging stations.

Springfield
Springfield installed the first public charging stations in Western Massachusetts in 2018 at Union Station.

Worcester
, about 4% of vehicles in Worcester were electric.

References

Road transportation in Massachusetts
Massachusetts